Cecil Magouel Filanckembo  (born 15 April 1988) is a Congolese professional footballer who plays as a defender for Stade Pontivyen.

Career
Filanckembo began his career with Brazzaville based football Academy CNFF.

In 2007, he represented the Congo U-20 at the 2007 FIFA U-20 World Cup in Canada (four matches, one goal) and the African Youth Championship U-20. Filanckembo represented his homeland by the 2007 FIFA U-17 World Cup in Korea Republic, played four games and shot one goal by the tournament.

References

External links
 

1988 births
Living people
People from Likouala Department
French footballers
Republic of the Congo footballers
Association football forwards
Republic of the Congo international footballers
Championnat National 2 players
Championnat National 3 players
CARA Brazzaville players
Saint-Colomban Sportive Locminé players
Republic of the Congo expatriate footballers
Republic of the Congo expatriate sportspeople in France
Expatriate footballers in France